An eight-part abrogative referendum was held in Italy on 18 April 1993. Voters were asked whether they approved of the repealing of laws on limiting intervention of local health units in dealing with environmental pollution, limiting the use of medicinal drugs, political party finances, the use of proportional representation in the Senate of Italy and the regulation of public banks, as well as the abolition of the Ministry of Agricultural, Food and Forestry Policies, the Ministry of State Holdings, and the Ministry of Tourism. All eight proposals were approved with support ranging from 55.3% to 90.3%.

Results

Repealing of the law limiting the intervention of local health units in environmental problems

Repealing of the law limiting the use of medicinal drugs

Repealing of the political party financing law

Repealing of the law regulating the administration of public banks

Replacing proportional representation with winner-takes-all for the Senate elections

Abolition of the Ministry of Agriculture

Abolition of the Ministry of State Holdings

Abolition of the Ministry of Tourism

References

1993 referendums
1993 elections in Italy
Referendums in Italy
April 1993 events in Europe